Gaomi railway station is a railway station in Gaomi, a county-level city under the administration of Weifang, Shandong.  It is on the Qingdao-Jinan Passenger Railway (running CRH trains and passenger trains) and Qingdao-Jinan Railway (running freight trains and some passenger trains which give way to CRH trains).

Service 
All types of trains stop at Gaomi Station, ranging from regular trains (denoted without a letter) to the high-speed trains (denoted with a "G").  Regular trains mostly offer service throughout Shandong province, with destinations such as Cao County, Qingdao, and Yantai.  A few trains also provide service to Shijiazhuang in Hebei province and Zhengzhou in Henan province.

High-speed trains also often stop at Gaomi, as it lies on the Qingdao-Jinan Passenger Railway.  Most of these trains go to either terminal, Qingdao and Yantai or Jinan. However, a few trains do extend beyond the railway.

References 

Railway stations in Shandong
Railway stations in China opened in 1901
Stations on the Qingdao–Taiyuan High-Speed Railway
Stations on the Qingdao–Jinan passenger railway